Millennium is the seventh full-length studio album by industrial band Front Line Assembly, released in 1994 by Roadrunner Records on both Compact Disc and LP formats. The album is also being planned for an LP release in 2020, by the Canadian label Artoffact. The album marks the first major use of metal guitars, shifting in musical direction from their typical electro-industrial sound. The riffs were obtained from samples and the musicianship of the then unknown Devin Townsend of Strapping Young Lad, who would also contribute and perform on the next album.

Background
Following Tactical Neural Implant, FLA's record label Third Mind was acquired by Roadrunner Records; at the time, according to Fulber, the band was working on a more melodic, synth-poppy followup. The direction changed when Roadrunner sent the band a box of promotional CDs from metal bands, and Leeb suggested sampling some riffs off those CDs for a more harsher sound; "This Faith" and "Search and Destroy" were songs that were carried over from those sessions, with the latter having some guitars added to gel better with the rest of the record.

Musical style
Shifting from the electronic music dominated style of Front Line Assembly's former works, Millennium makes heavy use of metal guitars. "[W]e just wanted to like do a different kind of record and just basically broadened our sound and our appeal", Bill Leeb said in an interview with Chaos Control about the change in sound, adding, "we also wanted to challenge the fans that we have, the listeners, because I’ve always been a die-hard purist in electronic music. I mean, if I could change I thought anybody else could, too." Some of the guitar sounds are used as looped samples, some are played live in the studio. A further addition to Front Line Assembly's sound on Millennium is rap on "Victim of a Criminal". The only typical electro-industrial track on the album is "This Faith", which is devoid of metal guitars.

Instrumental samples
Millennium created samples from several metal songs:
 "Millennium", "Division of Mind" : "A New Level" (Pantera - Vulgar Display of Power)
 "Surface Patterns" : "Walk" (Pantera - Vulgar Display of Power), "Don't Tread on Me" (Metallica - Metallica)
 "Victim of a Criminal" : "Dead Embryonic Cells" (Sepultura - Arise).

There are also samples from songs of other bands:
 "Vigilante" : "Esperanto" (Elektric Music - Esperanto)
 "Millennium" : "Get Right With Me" (Depeche Mode - Songs of Faith and Devotion)
 "Search and Destroy" : "Nasa Arab" (Coil Vs. The Eskaton - Nasa Arab), "Religion (Pussy Whipped Mix)" (Front 242 - 06:21:03:11 Up Evil)
 "Sex Offender" : "Shout (US Remix)" (Tears for Fears - Songs from the Big Chair)

Release
The album was re-released on July 30, 2007, by Polish record label Metal Mind Productions as a limited two disc remastered edition. The second disc of which contains all of the remixes and B-sides from the "Millennium" and "Surface Patterns" singles. The re-release was issued on golden discs and was limited to 2000 copies and numbered.

The track "Surface Patterns" is featured on the soundtrack album of 1995 American horror film Hideaway.

In October 2019, Canadian label Artoffact started a crowdfunding campaign in order to obtain the album licenses and to re-release the album on vinyl on May 4, 2020.

Singles
The release of the "Millennium" single preceded the release of the album. The single contains three remixes of the title song. Non-album track "Transtime" uses a sample from the song "Home Computer" which was released by German electronic music band Kraftwerk on their 1981 album Computer World. "Transtime" is also featured on the compilation album Monument. The video clip that was shot for the track "Millennium" was filmed in Seattle and Chicago.

The second single, "Surface Patterns", features three remixes of the title track and non-album track "Internal Combustion". The cardboard case is mislabeled "Suface Patterns" on the spine.

Track listing

Personnel

Front Line Assembly
 Bill Leeb – programming, vocals
 Rhys Fulber – programming

Additional musicians
 Devin Townsend – guitar (1, 7, 10)
 Don Harrison – guitar (4, 9)
 Che the Minister of Defense – vocals (6)

Technical personnel
 Greg Reely – engineering, mixing
 Delwyn Brooks – assistant engineering
 Brian Gardner – mastering
 Dave McKean – design, illustration, photography

Chart positions and awards

Chart positions

Awards
Millennium was nominated for the Juno Awards of 1995 in the category Best Hard Rock Album.

References

Front Line Assembly albums
1994 albums
Roadrunner Records albums
Albums with cover art by Dave McKean
Industrial metal albums
Albums produced by Rhys Fulber